Robert Camilleri Azzopardi O.F.M. (born 24 April 1951) is the bishop of the Diocese of Comayagua in Honduras since 2004.

Biography

Robert Camilleri Azzopardi was born in Ħamrun, Malta on 24 April 1951 to John Camilleri and Marianne Azzopardi. He is the fifth in a family of six other brothers and three sisters. He became a Franciscan and was ordained on 29 June 1975 by Pope Paul VI in Rome. When back in Malta he became the master of novices for three years and then departed as a missionary to Honduras. In Honduras he became the Parish Priest of La Libertad for 10 years when he was transferred to El Calvario in Comayagüela in 1992.

On 26 July 2001, Pope John Paul II appointed him as the Auxiliary Bishop of Tegucigalpa and Titular Bishop of Vagada. He was consecrated on the feast of the Assumption in the Basilica of Nuesta Senora de Suyapa by Cardinal Óscar Andrés Rodríguez Maradiaga. In 2004 he was appointed to the Diocese of Comayagua. He was installed as the third bishop on 24 July 2004.

In June 2022 he was elected to a three-year term as president of the Episcopal Conference of Honduras.

See also

References

20th-century Maltese Roman Catholic priests
1951 births
21st-century Roman Catholic bishops in Honduras
Living people
People from Ħamrun
Franciscan bishops
Roman Catholic bishops of Tegucigalpa
Roman Catholic bishops of Comayagua